This is a list of all personnel changes for the 2019 Indian Premier League.

Pre-auction
IPL set the deadline of 15 November for both the trading window and the list of retained and released players.

Transfers
After being unhappy with his retention price by Sunrisers Hyderabad, Shikhar Dhawan was rumored to be transferred to Mumbai Indians, or Kings XI Punjab before eventually returning to his home team of Delhi Capitals.     

 ↓: Player(s) was/were swapped with the player(s) mentioned in the next row(s).
 ↑: Player(s) was/were swapped with the player(s) mentioned in the previous row(s).

Released players
Gautam Gambhir, Yuvraj Singh and Glenn Maxwell were the prominent names among the released players. Jaydev Unadkat, the costliest Indian player in 2018 auction, was also released.

 REP: Players who were unsold originally in 2018 auction but were later signed up as a replacement player.
 RET: Players who were retained by the teams before the 2018 auction.

Retained players
The team retentions were announced on 15 November 2018.

: Players who were traded after the 2019 auction.

Summary

 Maximum overseas players: 9; Squad size-  Min:18 and Max:25; Budget:₹82 crore

Auction
The player auction was held on 18 December 2018 at Jaipur.  The auction was reckoned to be affected by limited availability of foreign players due to the 2019 Cricket World Cup. Initially 1003 players submitted their names for auction and the franchises were asked to submit their final shortlist by 10 December. 346 players were shortlisted. 5 more players were added to list on auction day making the final list to 351 including 228 Indian players.  Ten players have listed themselves at the base price of Rs. 2 crore. 60 players were sold and amount of Rs.106.8 crore was spent in the auction. Jaydev Unadkat and uncapped Varun Chakravarthy were the costliest players at Rs.8.4 crore. Sam Curran was the most expensive foreign player at Rs. 7.2 crore. Prominent players like Cheteshwar Pujara, Brendon McCullum and Alex Hales remained unsold.

Summary
 Maximum overseas players: 8; Squad size- Min:18 and Max:25; Budget:₹82 Crore 
 Note: Associate players are not classified as either capped or uncapped.

Sold players

Source:Vivo IPL 2019 Player Auction 
 ACC: Players who were part of accelerated bidding.
 REC-1/2/3: Players unsold originally but brought back for Recall Round-1, 2 or 3.
 DI-REC-2/3: Players not called in accelerated process but were brought back for Recall Round-2  or 3.
 * : Players were in the squad for the season but did not play any match.
 0 : Players mentioned as 0 in IPL matches column were part of the squad but did not play any matches.

Unsold players
The following players remained unsold at the end of the auction.

Source:Vivo IPL 2019 Player Auction 
 LAT: Players who were not in the initial shortlist of 346 but were later  added on the auction day.
 ACC: Players who were part of accelerated bidding.
 NCA: Players who were not called for the auction.
 REC-1/2/1&2: Players unsold originally in the auction but brought back for Recall Round-1 or 2 or both.
 DI-REC-2: Players not called in accelerated process but were brought back for Recall Round-2.
 REP: Players not sold in the auction but later came as replacement player for sold players.

 * : Players were in the squad for the season but did not play any match.
 0 : Players mentioned as 0 in IPL matches column were part of the squad but did not play any matches.

Post-auction trading
A trading window opened after the auction took place with a deadline of 5:00PM 30 days prior to the start of the 2019 season.

Withdrawn players
The following players withdrew from the tournament either due to injuries or because of other reasons.

Support staff changes

References

External links

Indian Premier League personnel changes
2019 Indian Premier League